Uzma Z. Rizvi is an archaeologist and associate professor of Anthropology and Urban Studies, Department of Social Science and Cultural Studies at Pratt Institute and a visiting scholar at Shah Abdul Latif University, Khairpur, Pakistan. Her research focuses on Ancient Pakistan and United Arab Emirates, during the third millennium BCE and ancient subjectivity, intimate architecture; memory, war, and trauma in relationship to the urban fabric, critical heritage studies at the intersections of contemporary art and history, and finally, epistemological critiques of the discipline in the service of decolonization.

Education
She graduated with a BA in Classical and Near Eastern Archaeology from Bryn Mawr College in 1995 and received her PhD in Anthropology from the Department of Anthropology, University of Pennsylvania in 2007.

Career
She organizes and contributes to Anthrodendum and is the series editor for Springer Briefs, Decolonizing Archaeology and Heritage. She directed the documentary ‘Telling Stories, Constructing Narratives: Gender Equity in Archaeology’ (2007).

Rizvi was the Director of Mapping Margins for the Fikra Graphic Design Biennale in 2018 in which she evoked the future of critical design while providing strategies to decenter and decolonize disciplinary lines of control, which took place as a series of communal feasts, conversations, and pedagogical experiments.

Rizvi is curating (with Murtaza Vali) the National Pavilion of Saudi Arabia at the Venice Architecture Biennale 2021, featuring Studio Bound (Hussam Dakkak, Basmah Kaki, and Hessa AlBader). Entitled Accommodations, this exhibition reflects on the theme of "How Will We Live Together?" through the lens of quarantine, both current and historical, the Pavilion will be presented as an experiential exhibition rooted in archival research. Envisioned as several spaces within a space, the three-part exhibition will invite visitors into the realms of quarantine through which they will explore the intertwining relationship between inclusion and exclusion. The exhibition will examine the evolution of enclosures as they respond to external contexts, derive new meanings from novel situations, and redefine the relationship between the individual, the community and the other.

Rizvi is the PI (with Can Sucuoglu) of LIAVH (Laboratory of Integrated Archaeological Visualization and Heritage), and is currently working on the documentation and visualization of MohenjoDaro. She was featured in the PBS documentary, First Civilizations, speaking about MohenjoDaro and urban planning.

She is the chair for the New York Academy of Sciences, Anthropology Section.

Research and authorship
Her chapter "Decolonizing Methodologies as Strategies of Practice: Operationalizing the Postcolonial Critique in the Archaeology of Rajasthan" in Archaeology and the Postcolonial Critique (AltaMira Press, 2008) specifically identified modes by which archaeological practice could be decolonized through community and participatory practice. Rizvi edited (with Jane Lydon) World Archaeological Congress Research Handbook on Postcolonialism and Archaeology (Left Coast Press, 2010). She wrote "Accounting for Multiple Desires: Decolonizing Methodologies, Archaeology and the Public Interest" (India Review, 2006) and "Crafting Resonance: Empathy and Belonging in Ancient Rajasthan" (Journal of Social Archaeology, 2015). She is also the author of The Affect of Crafting: Third Millennium BCE Copper Arrowheads from Ganeshwar, Rajasthan (2018).

Selected publications
Liebmann, M., & Rizvi, U. Z. (2010). Archaeology and the postcolonial critique. AltaMira Press. 
Lydon, J., & Rizvi, U. Z. (2010). Handbook of Postcolonial Archaeology. Routledge.
Rizvi, U. (2006). Accounting for Multiple Desires: Decolonizing Methodologies, Archaeology, and the Public Interest. India Review, 5, 394-416.
Rizvi, U. Z. (2015). Crafting resonance: Empathy and belonging in ancient Rajasthan: Journal of Social Archaeology, 15(2), 254–273.
Rizvi, U. Z. (2017). On being and care. Joining the conversation on the symmetries/asymmetries of human–thing relations. Archaeological Dialogues, 24(2), 142–144.
Rizvi, U. (2018). The Affect of Crafting: Third Millennium BCE Copper Arrowheads from Ganeshwar, Rajasthan. 10.2307/j.ctvndv55b.

References

External links
 

Living people
American archaeologists
American women archaeologists
Pratt Institute faculty
Year of birth missing (living people)
University of Pennsylvania alumni
American women academics
21st-century American women